Pseudophragmatobia is a genus of moths in the family Erebidae from South Africa.

Species
 Pseudophragmatobia cinnamomea Krüger, 2009
 Pseudophragmatobia limbata Krüger, 2009
 Pseudophragmatobia salmo Krüger, 2009
 Pseudophragmatobia parvula (Felder, 1874)
 Pseudophragmatobia paucirubra Krüger, 2009
 Pseudophragmatobia perpunctata Krüger, 2009
 Pseudophragmatobia unicolor Krüger, 2009

References
 , 2009: Pseudophragmatobia gen.n. from southern Africa, with description of six new species (Lepidoptera: Arctiidae, Arctiinae, Arctiini). Entomologische Zeitschrift 119 (5): 223-232, Stuttgart.

Spilosomina
Moth genera